Vetulinidae is a family of sponges belonging to the order Sphaerocladina.

Genera:
 Macrobrochus Schrammen, 1910
 Ozotrachelus de Laubenfels, 1955
 Vetulina Schmidt, 1879

References

Heteroscleromorpha
Sponge families